Men Behind the Sun (literally Black Sun: 731, also sometimes called Man Behind the Sun) is a 1988 Hong Kong historical exploitation horror film directed by T. F. Mou, and written by Mei Liu, Wen Yuan Mou and Dun Jing Teng. The film is a graphic depiction of the war atrocities committed by the Japanese at Unit 731, the secret biological weapons experimentation unit of the Imperial Japanese Army during World War II. It details the various cruel medical experiments Unit 731 inflicted upon Chinese and Siberian prisoners towards the end of the war.

It is the first film to be classified "level III" (equivalent to the US rating NC-17) in Hong Kong.

Plot
The film opens with the passage "Friendship is friendship; history is history."

A group of Japanese boys are conscripted into the Youth Corps. They are assigned to the Kwantung Army, and are brought to one of the facilities serving Unit 731, which is headed by Shiro Ishii. Soon, they are introduced to the experiments going on at the facility, for which they feel revulsion. The purpose of the experiments is to find a highly contagious strain of bubonic plague, to be used as a last-ditch weapon against the Chinese population.

Meanwhile, the young soldiers befriend a local mute Chinese boy with whom they play games of catch. One day, the commanding officers ask the boys to bring the Chinese child to the facility. Naively, they follow orders believing that no real harm will come to the boy; however, the senior medical staff places the boy in surgery for the purpose of harvesting his organs for research. When the young soldiers realize what has happened, they stage a minor uprising by ganging up and physically beating their commanding officer.

As the war goes on, the situation becomes increasingly desperate for the Japanese, and therefore Unit 731. In one of their last experiments, they tie a number of Chinese prisoners to crosses, intending them to be used as targets for a prototype ceramic bomb containing infectious fleas; however, they are not able to contact their airfield due to a retreat. Chinese prisoners break free from the crosses, and attempt to escape; however, Japanese troops hunt them down, and nearly all of them are run over or shot, including several Japanese.

Returning to the facility after the aborted experiment, Unit 731 runs out of time and they are forced to destroy their research and all other evidence of the atrocities happening there. Dr. Ishii initially orders his subordinates and their families to commit suicide, but is persuaded instead to evacuate them and only commit suicide if captured. However, he makes it clear that secrecy is to be maintained, with dire consequences.

Japanese troops gather at a train station to be transported out of China. One of the Chinese prisoners, having disguised himself and escaped with a group of soldiers, is discovered by an officer. During a short scuffle in which he kills the officer before being killed himself, his blood stains the Japanese flag, to the horror of the Youth Corps. The train leaves the station.

The closing passages reveal that Dr. Ishii cooperates with the Americans, giving them his research and agreeing to work for them. Years later, he is moved to the Korean front, and biological weapons appear on the battlefield shortly thereafter. The Youth Corps involved with 731 are revealed to have led hard lives after the war, but kept the vow that none of the atrocities they witnessed would be revealed or discussed to the public.

Cast

Controversy
Though Mou claims he was trying to depict historical accuracy with the film, he has been criticized by Hong Kong critics that the film's appearance as an exploitation film negates any educational value involving a historical atrocity,  and Japanese critics deemed the film as anti-Japan propaganda. American horror critics have deemed the film as genuinely horrifying, but lacked in writing, narrative structure, and agreed with Hong Kong critics regarding the educational value and has no official US release. 

Because of its graphic content, the film has suffered mass controversy with censors all over the world. It was originally banned in Australia and caused public outcry in Japan to such an extent that director Mou even received threats on his life. The film was given several minutes of mandated cuts to be allowed a release in the United Kingdom.

The film garnered further controversy for its use of what Mou claims to be actual autopsy footage of a young boy and also for a scene in which a live cat appears to be thrown into a room to be eaten alive by hundreds of frenzied rats. Although in the 2010 documentary Black Sunshine: Conversations With T.F. Mou,  Mou confessed that the cat was tired after participation in the film and got two fish as a reward, that the cat was made wet with honey and theater blood (as opposed to real blood like other scenes as the rat would attack otherwise), and that the rats were licking and eating the honey only.

Reception
The film was panned for its directionless narrative & insensitivity to historical tragedies. From contemporary reviews, "Lor." of Variety declared the film to be a "lowbrow exploitationer treating a serious subject, Japanese war atrocities." noting that "Explosive material is dramatically potent and could have been handled tastefully, as with Kon Ichikawa's classic films like Fires on the Plain" but "resorts to nauseating sensationalism, with butcher-shop depiction of autopsies on live subjects, a disgusting "decompression" experiment spewing intestines out of a victim and a horrendously realistic scene of a pussycat bloodily mauled by a room full of rats."

Sequels
The film spawned three pseudo-sequels:
  (黑太陽731續集之殺人工廠, 1992)
 Narrow Escape (死亡列車, 1994)
 Black Sun: The Nanking Massacre (黑太陽─南京大屠殺, 1995)

See also
 Philosophy of a Knife
 Unit 731

References

Sources

External links
 
 
 Robert Firsching's review

1988 films
1988 horror films
1980s Mandarin-language films
1980s exploitation films
Films set in the 1940s
1980s historical horror films
Japanese human subject research
Second Sino-Japanese War films
Obscenity controversies in film
Films about war crimes
Censored films
Hong Kong splatter films
World War II films
Films directed by Mou Tun-fei
Torture in films
Hong Kong war films
Hong Kong horror films
Horror war films
Cultural depictions of Japanese men
Cultural depictions of male criminals
Films about fascism
1980s Hong Kong films